The 1871 Limerick City by-election was fought on 20 September 1871.  The byelection was fought due to the death of the incumbent Liberal MP, Francis William Russell.  It was won by the Home Rule League candidate Isaac Butt, who was unopposed.  The gain was retained by the Home Rule League at the 1874 general election.

References

Politics of Limerick (city)
By-elections to the Parliament of the United Kingdom in County Limerick constituencies
1871 elections in the United Kingdom
Unopposed by-elections to the Parliament of the United Kingdom (need citation)
1871 elections in Ireland